The Forever King is a fantasy book written by Molly Cochran and Warren Murphy, the authors of Grandmaster, which reached #3 on The New York Times bestseller list. The Forever King is the first in the Forever King Trilogy. The second title is The Broken Sword: King Arthur Returns while the third book is called The Third Magic. Robert Jordan, author of The Wheel of Time calls The Forever King "a fresh and exciting view of the Arthur legend.”

Set in modern and medieval times, the antagonist Saladin has lived through many of the world's ages by using the Holy Grail, until he loses it. The Cup finds its way into the hands of ten-year-old Arthur Blessing. Now Hal Woczniak must protect Arthur and the Grail from the madman Saladin, who kills anyone that ever stands in his way or between him and the Cup. The Forever King is 55 chapters divided into three sections titled, “Book One: The Boy,” “Book Two: The Cup,” and “Book Three: The King.”

Summary

From the front inside flap of The Forever King:

In a darkened house not far from the place where Camelot may once have stood, a madman schemes.

Once the cup that men call the Holy Grail was his. Soon it will be his again. The Grail's protectors are few and weak: an alcohol-soaked ex-FBI agent; a courtly old gentleman who once, long ago, held awesome power; and a ten-year-old boy.

Arthur Blessing is no ordinary boy. The Grail is his by chance, this time, but the power to keep it-is his by right.

Now he must stay alive long enough to use that power.

Arthur needs a defender, a man of great strength, skill, purity, and faith. Fate has given him Hal Woczniak, a broken-down drifter plagued by nightmare memories of a dead child. When Hal quit the FBI, he practically quit the human race as well.

Now, at the darkest time in his life, he is offered the chance to redeem himself.

One he failed to save a child. Once he failed to save a world.

He will not fail again.

Main characters

Arthur Blessing (also known as King Arthur)- ten-year-old Chicago boy that finds the Holy Grail and is the reincarnated Arthur of England.
Hal Woczniak (also known as the Siege Perilous, Galahad)- drunk ex-FBI agent that fights to protect Arthur and is the reincarnated Sir Galahad.
Merlin (also known as Mr. Goldberg, Bertram Taliesin)- wizard of Camelot and mentor of Arthur who seeks to give Arthur the Cup.
Saladin (also known as Mr. X, King Saladin, the Saracen Knight)- antagonist who has lived for thousands of years and will stop at nothing to get the Holy Grail back.

Secondary characters

Bohort- a knight of the Round Table.
Chastain- Scotland Yard lab agent that assists Candy in the investigation.
Chief- director of the FBI that Hal calls on for help.
Constable James “Jack” Nubbit- dense local constable first put in charge of finding Arthur.
Dr. Mark Coles- Saladin's doctor in the asylum Maplebrook.
Emily Blessing- brilliant but easily distressed aunt that raised Arthur Blessing.
Frank Morton- director of the game show “Go Fish.”
Gaheris- a knight of the Round Table.
Gawain, the green knight- a knight of the Round Table.
Hafiz Chagla- one of Saladin's men and the electrician at Maplebrook that helped him escape.
Hamid Laghouat- one of Saladin's men, an Algerian that worked as an assistant at the Bournemouth library while Saladin was at Maplebrook.
Higgins- Scotland Yard lab agent that assists Candy in the investigation.
Inspector Brian Candy- Scotland Yard inspector sent to help Hal and Emily find Arthur.
Jeff Brown- abducted boy that Hal could not save from a burning building when he was still an FBI agent.
Joe Starr- host of the CBS gameshow “Go Fish” that Hal plays.
Kanna- a caveman that lived for hundreds or thousands of years with the Cup before Saladin stole it from him.
Launcelot- a knight of the Round Table.
Lionel- a knight of the Round Table.
Lucan- a knight of the Round Table.
Matilda Grimes- old English woman that is Wilson-on-Hamble's tax collector, village clerk, and building inspector. She keeps the county records and helps Hal find the house where Arthur is being kept.
Mordred- twelve-year-old boy and alleged son of Arthur. He stabs Arthur in battle which kills Arthur, although not before Arthur stabs Mordred back- killing him.
Mrs. Sloan- inn keeper in England where Hal and Emily stay.
Mustafa Aziz- one of Saladin's men.
Nimue (also known as The Lady of the Lake)- wild but beautiful young woman that lives in the woods and can talk to animals.
Perceval- a knight of the Round Table.
Tom Rogers- boy that comes to see Camelot and hear the hoof beats of the knights riding each St. John's Eve.
Tristam- a knight of the Round Table.
Vinod Abad- one of Saladin's men.

References

 Cochran, Molly, and Warren Murphy. The Forever King. New York, NY: Tom Doherty Associates, Inc., 1992. Print. .

External links
 The Forever King at Google Books
 Review at Publishers Weekly

1992 novels
Modern Arthurian fiction
Tor Books books